Bruce Baskett is an Australian journalist who was the last editor of The Herald from 1989 until it was merged with its morning sister paper The Sun News-Pictorial in 1990. Upon the merger, Baskett was appointed the first editor of the new Herald-Sun. Although he later left The Herald and Weekly Times, Baskett continues to contribute to articles for the Herald Sun upon the deaths of old Herald, Sun, and Herald Sun colleagues.

References

Australian journalists
Living people
Year of birth missing (living people)
The Herald (Melbourne) people